Louis François Armand (17 January 1905 – 30 August 1971) was a French engineer and senior civil servant who managed several public companies, as well as had a significant role in World War II as an officer in the Resistance. He became the first president of the European Atomic Energy Community (Euratom) as chair of the Armand Commission from 1958 to 1959 before he was elected to the Académie Française in 1963.

A station on Marseille Metro Line 1 opened in 2010 under Boulevard Louis-Armand bears his name.

Biography

Early years
Louis Armand was born in Cruseilles, Haute-Savoie, and studied in Annecy and in Lyon at the Lycée du Parc. He graduated second in his class from the École Polytechnique (class of 1924), then joined the Corps des Mines and was major from École des Mines. He married his wife, Genevieve Gazel, in 1928.

Career
He joined the Compagnie du chemin de fer Paris à Lyon et à la Méditerranée (PLM) in 1934, transferring to the Société Nationale des Chemins de fer Français (SNCF) when the PLM was nationalised in 1938. In 1940–1941 he invented a method for preventing the calcification, furring up, of engine boilers called the Traitement Integral Armand (TIA) water treatment process for steam locomotives.

During the Second World War he organized and led the Resistance group named Résistance-Fer, from February 1943 onwards. He was arrested by the Gestapo on 25 June 1944. He was liberated from jail during the liberation of Paris, and was decorated with the Croix de la Liberation.

In 1949, Armand was named the general manager of the SNCF and created the Société du tunnel sous la Manche in 1957. During this time, he pushed for the electrification of the rail system using AC voltage.

From 1958 to 1959, he managed the European atomic energy commission (Euratom), having inspired its creation.

In the late 1960s, after May 1968 in Paris, Louis Armand was instrumental in helping Christian LeClercq and the Junior Chamber of Commerce of Brussels to start a new European thinktank and membership organization: "L'Entreprise de Demain - Forum for Tomorrow".
 
This non-profit and non-political organization was soon going to leave the Junior Chamber of Commerce to become independent. To help that organization, Louis Armand, as a visionary global thinker, provided access to some of the best "global leaders" in international business, world politics, academia and scientific research who addressed the Forum, under the royal guidance of Baudouin I of Belgium.

"L'Entreprise de Demain - Forum for Tomorrow" soon developed chapters in Denmark, France, Switzerland and the United States, allowing some of the most brilliant minds of the time to address corporate executives and share their views about the future of the world.

Louis Armand wrote a book on "l'Entreprise de Demain" in 1970, and the history of the organization was also published in the "Que Sais-Je?" collection.
 
In 1971, Louis Armand successfully pushed to have the word "creativity" included in the French dictionary.

Armand died in Villers-sur-Mer, at 66.

Without the visionary inspiration and guidance of Louis Armand, "L'Entreprise de Demain - Forum for Tomorrow" could never have been formed. The worldwide organization lasted for well over 20 years. Its founder and international president, Christian LeClercq, died in July 2011.

Bibliography
1961 : Plaidoyer pour l’avenir
1965 : De la Savoie au Val d’Aoste par le tunnel du Mont-Blanc
1968 : Simples propos
1968 : Le pari européen (with Michel Drancourt)
1969 : Propos ferroviaires
1970 : De la cybernétique à l’intéressement
1970 : L’Entreprise de demain
1974 : Message pour ma patrie professionnelle

References

 Buzaré, Josette (2000). Louis Armand, le savoyard du siècle. Saint-Julien-en-Genevois, France: Éd. La Salévienne.

External links

1905 births
1971 deaths
People from Haute-Savoie
Members of the Académie Française
French Resistance members
20th-century French engineers
French people in rail transport
Italian European Commissioners
Companions of the Liberation
Grand Officiers of the Légion d'honneur
SNCF people